Patrick deWitt (born 1975) is a Canadian novelist and screenwriter. Born on Vancouver Island, deWitt lives in Portland, Oregon and has acquired American citizenship. As of 2018, he has written four novels: Ablutions (2009), The Sisters Brothers (2011), Undermajordomo Minor (2015) and French Exit (2018).

Biography 
DeWitt was born on Vancouver Island at Sidney, British Columbia. The second of three brothers, he spent his childhood moving back and forth across the west coast of North America. He credits his father, a carpenter, with giving him his "lifelong interest in literature." DeWitt dropped out of high school to become a writer. He moved to Los Angeles, working at a bar. He left Los Angeles to move back in with his parents in the Seattle area, on Bainbridge Island. When he sold his first book Ablutions (2009), deWitt quit his job as a construction worker to become a writer, and moved to Portland, Oregon.

Although born a Canadian citizen, deWitt was raised primarily in Southern California, and later become a United States citizen. He married screenwriter Leslie Napoles, an American, with whom he has a son named Gustavo. He is separated from his wife, but they are amicable and share the care of their son.

Career
His first book, Ablutions: Notes for a Novel (2009), was named a New York Times Editors' Choice book. His second, The Sisters Brothers (2011), was shortlisted for the 2011 Man Booker Prize, the 2011 Scotiabank Giller Prize, the Rogers Writers' Trust Fiction Prize, and the 2011 Governor General's Award for English-language fiction. He was one of two Canadian writers, alongside Esi Edugyan, to make all four award lists in 2011. On November 1, 2011, he was announced as the winner of the Rogers Prize, and on November 15, 2011, he was announced as the winner of Canada's 2011 Governor General's Award for English-language fiction. On April 26, 2012, the novel won the 2012 Stephen Leacock Award. Alongside Edugyan, The Sisters Brothers was also a shortlisted nominee for the 2012 Walter Scott Prize for historical fiction. The Sisters Brothers was adapted as a film of the same name released in 2018.

His third novel, Undermajordomo Minor, was published in 2015. The novel was longlisted for the 2015 Scotiabank Giller Prize.

His fourth novel, French Exit, was published in August 2018 by Ecco Press, an imprint of HarperCollins. The book was named as a shortlisted finalist for the 2018 Giller Prize. He wrote the screenplay for the 2020 film of the same name.

DeWitt's most recent novel, The Librarianist, will be published on July 4, 2023, by Ecco Press. It follows a retired librarian named Bob Comet and is billed as a "wide-ranging and ambitious document of the introvert's condition."

Bibliography

Novels
Ablutions: Notes for a Novel (2009)
The Sisters Brothers (2011)
Undermajordomo Minor (2015)
French Exit (2018)
The Librarianist (2023)

Nonfiction
Help Yourself Help Yourself (2007)

Screenplays
Terri (2011)
French Exit (2020)

References

External links
 "Patrick deWitt interview: 'Certain writers look down their noses at plot. I was one of them – until I tried it'" (2015 interview in The Guardian)
 "'The Internet Was Fucking Me Up:' Patrick DeWitt On Books, Bubbles, & Bullshit" (2015 interview on Buzzfeed)

1975 births
Living people
21st-century American novelists
21st-century American male writers
21st-century Canadian novelists
21st-century Canadian male writers
American male novelists
Canadian male novelists
Canadian expatriate writers in the United States
People from the Capital Regional District
People with acquired American citizenship
Writers from British Columbia
Writers from Portland, Oregon
Governor General's Award-winning fiction writers